Sh'af A'l Nassir  is a Mountain in Saudi Arabia. 

References

Mountains of Saudi Arabia